The Tred Avon River (a corruption of "Third Haven River") is a main tributary of the Choptank River in Talbot County on Maryland's Eastern Shore.

Geography
The mouth is marked by the Choptank River Light, a 35-foot spider in the main channel.

Name
"Tred Avon" is a corruption of "Third Haven." It follows the dropped 'h' characteristic of early Chesapeake sailors from western England. The United States Geological Survey's Geographic Names Information System lists the following variant names for the Tred Avon River:
Third Haven Creek
Third Haven River
Threadhaven Creek
Trad Avon River
Tread Haven Creek
Treavon Creek
Tred Aven River
Tred Haven River
Tredaven Creek
Tredaven Creeke
Tredavon Creeke
Tredhaven Creek
Trudhaven River

History

With the colonial port of Oxford founded near its mouth between 1666 and 1668, the river served as a major shipping lane in the international tobacco trade until the end of the American Revolutionary War, when wheat became the Eastern Shore's main cash crop and Oxford's monopoly on colonial trade ended, leading to an economic downturn. With the decline in trade came a post-Civil War rise in oyster harvesting, causing a renewed local economic boom lasting until the depletion of oyster beds in the Tred Avon and lower Choptank in the 1920s from overharvesting.

Maryland governor Martin O'Malley sought to revive the river's oyster beds through citizen participation by initiating the "Marylanders Grow Oysters" project in September 2008, which encourages waterfront property owners to grow oysters from their piers using cages; after a 9- to 12-month growing period, the oysters are moved to a protected sanctuary in the Tred Avon.

The Oxford–Bellevue Ferry, believed to be the oldest privately operated ferry service in the United States, offers shuttle service across the river from April to November.

See also

Chesapeake Bay
List of Maryland rivers

References

External links

NOAA nautical chart 12266 – Chesapeake Bay: Choptank River and Herring Bay (showing Tred Avon River)
Marylanders Grow Oysters

Tributaries of the Chesapeake Bay
Rivers of Maryland
Rivers of Talbot County, Maryland